The 2013–14 Baylor Lady Bears basketball team represented Baylor University in the 2013–14 NCAA Division I women's basketball season. The Lady Bears, led by Hall of Famer head coach Kim Mulkey, played their home games at the Ferrell Center in Waco, Texas and were members of the Big 12 Conference.

They finished the season with a record of 32–5 overall, 16–2 in Big 12 play to share the regular season title with West Virginia. They won the 2014 Big 12 women's basketball tournament to earn a trip to the 2014 NCAA Division I women's basketball tournament which they defeated Western Kentucky in first round, California in the 2nd round, and Kentucky in the Sweet Sixteen before losing to Notre Dame in the Elite Eight.

Before the season

Departures

Recruiting

Roster

Rankings

Schedule

|-
! colspan=9 style="background:#FECB00; color:#003015;"|Exhibition

|-
!colspan=9 style="background:#004834; color:#FECB00;"| Non-conference Regular Season

|-
!colspan=9 style="background:#FECB00; color:#003015;"| Big 12 Regular Season

|-
!colspan=9 style="background:#003015; color:#FECB00;"| Non-conference Regular Season

|-
!colspan=9 style="background:#FECB00; color:#003015;"| Big 12 Regular Season

|-
!colspan=9 style="background:#004834; color:#FDBB2F;" | 2014 Big 12 women's basketball tournament

|-
!colspan=9 style="background:#FDBB2F; color:#004834;" | 2014 Women's NCAA tournament

Source

See also
 2013–14 Baylor Bears basketball team

References

Baylor Bears women's basketball seasons
Baylor
Baylor